Balliang East is a small town 45 km west of Melbourne. The Local Government Area is the Shire of Moorabool while the population of the town is 199. Balliang East post office opened on the 1 August 1911 and closed on 24 November 1958. The people of Balliang East are mostly Catholic, Anglican while the majority of the rest have no religion.

References

External links

Towns in Victoria (Australia)